Luis Aguirrebeña (born 26 August 1915, date of death unknown) was a Chilean water polo player. He competed in the 1948 Summer Olympics. His younger brother Pedro was also a water polo player.

References

External links

1915 births
Year of death missing
Water polo players at the 1948 Summer Olympics
Sportspeople from Santiago
Chilean male water polo players
Olympic water polo players of Chile